Alice Griffiths (born 22 January 2001) is a Welsh footballer who plays for Southampton Women F.C.
Griffiths represented Wales at all youth levels and made her debut for the  senior team in 2017.

Early life
Griffiths was born and raised in Aberdare, Rhondda Cynon Taf. She attended St John the Baptist School. She has an older sister, Anna, who is also a footballer and has represented Wales at youth level. Her father, Nigel, has described Alice as "a very shy and quiet girl, but give her a pair of football boots and she thrives."

Club career
Griffiths began playing football with local amateur side Llwydcoed in the Aberdare and Rhondda Junior Football League. At under-16 level, she was the only female player in an otherwise all-boys league and received private tutoring to keep up with schoolwork she missed playing football. She joined Welsh Premier Women's Football League side Cyncoed Ladies in 2017 and was named the division's Young Player of the Year during her first season.

In 2018, she joined fellow Welsh Premier side Cardiff Met Ladies along with teammate Grace Horrell. During the 2018–19 season, Griffiths helped the side win a domestic treble, winning the league title, the FAW Women's Cup and the Welsh Premier Women's Cup.

In July 2019, Griffiths moved to England and signed with FA Women's Championship team Charlton Athletic.

International career
In 2014, Griffiths was named in a Wales under-16 training camp squad as the youngest member of the team, being two years under the age group level. Two years later she was called up to the under-17 team at the age of 15 after impressing in an otherwise all-boys league.

Griffiths was called up to the Wales senior squad in 2017. She made her debut in Wales' 1–0 victory over Kazakhstan in a 2019 FIFA Women's World Cup qualification round.

Honours
Cardiff Met. Ladies 
 FAW Women's Cup winner: 2018–19

Individual 
 Welsh Premier Women's Football League Young Player of the Year: 2017–18

References

2001 births
Living people
Welsh women's footballers
Wales women's international footballers
Women's association football midfielders
Women's Premier Soccer League players
Cardiff Met. Ladies F.C. players
Charlton Athletic W.F.C. players